Donald Cox may refer to:

Don Cox (born 1964), American singer
Don Cox (politician) (born 1940), American politician
Donald Cox (engineer) (born 1937), American electrical engineer
Donald L. Cox (1936–2011), American political organizer and member of the Black Panther Party